In alchemy, digestion is a process in which gentle heat is applied to a substance over a period of several weeks.

This was traditionally performed by sealing a sample of the substance in a flask, and keeping the flask in fresh horse dung or sometimes in direct sunlight. Today, practitioners of alchemy use thermostat-controlled incubators.

Digestion is considered one of the 12 core alchemical processes and is "ruled", or "dominated", by the zodiacal sign of Leo.

References 

Alchemical processes